Aishwarya oil field is located in Barmer district in Rajasthan state in India. It is India's second biggest oil discovery ; Cairn Energy Executives described as a 'living goddess'. It went into production in March, 2013 starting off at 30,000 barrels per day. The MBA field is expected to scale up to 200,000 in two years, which will be around 10% of India's total oil consumption. At its peak rate, its production will be equal to around 30% of India's present oil production.

References

Oil fields in India
Energy in Rajasthan
Barmer, Rajasthan
Geology of Rajasthan
Thar Desert
Vedanta oil and gas fields